Viasat Nature is a television channel owned by international media company, Viasat World LTD. The channel has a focus on animals and their owners, blue-chip, classic wildlife, ER and animal rescue, the natural world, and parks and sanctuaries. Viasat Nature is a 24-hour channel, broadcasting in Central and Eastern Europe, Russia, Scandinavia and Commonwealth of Independent States.

The channel has its origins in TV6, a Swedish women's channel started in 1994. In 1998, the channel was changed into a pan-Nordic pay channel showing nature documentaries from 6p.m. to 9 p.m. ("TV6 Nature World") and then action movies and series from 9 p.m. to midnight ("TV6 Action World"). In 2002, the channel was renamed and became Viasat Nature and Viasat Action.

Viasat Nature acquires programming from international distributors and production houses.

The content on Viasat Action was gradually shifted to include more crime series such as Law & Order and CSI. This strand was therefore rebranded into Viasat Crime on 1 October 2005. After several years as a six-hour channel, Viasat Nature/Crime extended its broadcasting hours on 1 February 2007. Viasat Nature would now broadcast from 6 a.m. to 8 p.m. when Viasat Crime took over and broadcast until midnight.

The channel has timeshared with many channels over the years. In its early years, the shopping channel TVG filled up much of the daytime schedule. In 1996, the sports channel Sportkanalen was broadcasting in the weekends. From 1997, Playboy TV has broadcast on the channel after midnight. Nickelodeon Scandinavia started broadcasting from 6 a.m. to 6 p.m. later on and continued to do so until 2007 when Viasat Nature extended its broadcasting hours.

References

External links 
 VIASAT Nature Swedish Site
 VIASAT Nature Norwegian Site
 VIASAT Nature Danish Site
 VIASAT Crime Swedish Site
 VIASAT Crime Norwegian Site
 VIASAT Crime Danish Site

Modern Times Group
Pan-Nordic television channels
Television stations in Denmark
Television channels and stations established in 1994
Television channels in North Macedonia